Vidyasagar Teachers' Training College, Midnapore (VTTC), also known as  Midnapore B.Ed. College, is a B.Ed. college situated in Midnapore, West Bengal.

It was established in 1968. The college, under West Bengal University of Teachers' Training, Education Planning and Administration, is also approved by the National Council for Teacher Education (NCTE) and the  University Grants Commission (UGC).

See also
 List of teacher education schools in India

References

External links
http://www.vttcollege.org.in/

Colleges of education in India
Universities and colleges in Paschim Medinipur district
Educational institutions established in 1968
1968 establishments in West Bengal